The 2016 season was York Region Shooters's 19th season in the Canadian Soccer League. It began on May 29, 2016 and concluded on October 23, 2016. The club finished the regular season with the First Division title with a new defensive club record. The organization qualified for the playoffs for the 14th consecutive season, and secured a victory in the preliminary round against Milton SC. In the semifinal York Region was eliminated from the competition in a penalty shootout to Hamilton City SC.

Their reserve side managed to also play in the postseason by finishing fourth in the Second Division, and secured their second championship. For the fourth consecutive season Richard West finished as the club's top goalscorer with 13 goals.

Summary 
In preparation for the 2016 season head coach Tony De Thomasis recruited several prominent Toronto Croatia veterans, and Caribbean internationals. Once the season commenced York Region produced an undefeated streak of eleven matches. As a result, finished the season as the First Division champions with a new club defensive record. In the opening round of the postseason York Region defeated Milton SC by a score of 5-0. In the semifinal the Shooters were defeated in a penalty shootout to Hamilton City SC.

In the Second Division the reserve team concluded the season with a postseason berth. In the preliminary rounds of the playoffs York Region Region B defeated London City SC, and SC Waterloo Region. In the championship final the Shooters claimed their second championship title after defeating Toronto Atomic B 2-1.

Club

Management

First Division roster
As of September 30, 2016.

Second Division roster 
As of December 23, 2016.

Transfers

In

Out

Competitions summary

Regular season

First division

Results summary

Results by round

Matches

Postseason

Second division

Statistics

Goals and assists 
Correct as of November, 2016

References 

York Region Shooters
York Region Shooters
2016